Mason of the Mounted is a 1932 American pre-Code Western film directed by Harry L. Fraser. It was the fourth Monogram Pictures eight-film Western film series "the Bill and Andy series" with Bill Cody co-starring with child actor Andy Shuford.

Plot
North-West Mounted Police Constable Bill Mason and two other Mounties are chasing a murderer who shoots and wounds one of them. When the murderer has entered the United States, Bill Mason goes undercover to get his man and bring him back to Canada for justice.  He finds that the murderer, now calling himself Calhoun is leading a group of rustlers. Without knowing his true identity, the locals have Mason elected as the head of a vigilante committee to stop the rustling.

Cast
Bill Cody as Bill Mason
Andy Shuford as Andy Talbot, Luke's Nephew
Nancy Drexel as Marion Kirby
LeRoy Mason as Calhoun
Jack Carlyle as Luke Kirby, Marion's Father
James A. Marcus as Marshal
Art Smith as R.N.W.M.P, Officer

External links

1932 films
1932 Western (genre) films
1930s English-language films
American black-and-white films
Fictional Royal Canadian Mounted Police officers
Films set in Canada
Monogram Pictures films
American Western (genre) films
Films with screenplays by Harry L. Fraser
Films directed by Harry L. Fraser
Royal Canadian Mounted Police in fiction
1930s American films